Pristimantis xylochobates is a species of frog in the family Strabomantidae.
It is endemic to Colombia.
Its natural habitat is tropical moist montane forests.
Like many species in the region, it is threatened by habitat loss.

References

xylochobates
Frogs of South America
Amphibians of Colombia
Endemic fauna of Colombia
Amphibians described in 1996
Taxonomy articles created by Polbot